Jake Schatz (born 25 July 1990) is an Australian rugby union player. He currently plays as flanker or Number 8  for London Irish. Schatz made his debut for the Reds during the 2010 Super 14 season. He was educated at John Paul College (Brisbane) and the Anglican Church Grammar School.

Schatz was selected as the 2008 QLD Premier Colts player of the year. He captained Sunnybank to the 2008 QLD Premier Colts premiership.

Schatz toured with the 2008 QLD Reds development squad on their end of season trip to Ireland and France.

Schatz was named captain of the Australian U20 team for the 2010 Junior World Championships in Argentina.

Schatz was awarded the QLD Reds 2010 Rookie of the Year prize.

On 5 June 2017 it was announced that Schatz had signed for London Irish in the English Premiership.

Super Rugby statistics

References

External links
 Queensland Reds profile

1990 births
Australian rugby union players
Australian people of German descent
Australia international rugby union players
Queensland Reds players
Brisbane City (rugby union) players
London Irish players
Rugby union flankers
People educated at Anglican Church Grammar School
Living people
People educated at John Paul College (Brisbane)
Australian expatriate rugby union players
Expatriate rugby union players in England
Rugby union number eights
Melbourne Rebels players
Expatriate rugby union players in Japan
Sunwolves players
Rugby union players from Queensland